Eleven Points Programme was a charter of demands in East Pakistan that called for reforms and the resignation of President Ayub Khan. It was led by students and was a successor to the Six point movement led by Sheikh Mujibur Rahman.

History
Eleven Points Programme was based on the Six point movement. The Six point movement started in 1966 called for the restoration of democracy and the resignation of military strongman, President Ayub Khan. The movement was led by Awami League and Sheikh Mujibur Rahman. The movement fluttered after the mass arrest of Awami League politicians. Sheikh Mujibur Rahman and senior Awami League leaders were arrested on the Agartala Conspiracy Case. The democracy movement was taken over by the newly formed Pakistan Democratic Movement and Democratic Action Committee. Both of which failed in their objective to restore democracy.  In October 1968, two fractions of East Pakistan Students Union, led by Rashed Khan Menon and Matia Chowdhury, and East Pakistan Students League formed an alliance called the Sarbadaliya Chhatra Sangram Parishad. The Parishad announced an 11 point demand that called for education reform, restoration of democracy, and autonomy for East Pakistan. The demands incorporated all the demands of the opposition in East Pakistan and the students became the leaders of the movement against President Ayub Khan. This culminated in the 1969 Mass uprising in East Pakistan and the subsequent withdrawal of Agartala Conspiracy Case. On 24 January 1971, mass uprising day was observed and political groups reiterate the 11 point demand.

References

History of East Pakistan
Causes and prelude of the Bangladesh Liberation War
1968 in Pakistan
Conflicts in 1968
Student protests in Pakistan
Social movements in Pakistan